Marthanda Varma is a 1933 black and white Indian silent film directed by P. V. Rao, based on the 1891 Malayalam novel by C. V. Raman Pillai. This was the first film based on Malayalam literature and the next film of the Malayalam film industry after Vigathakumaran.

Plot
Based on the novel Marthandavarma, the film recounts the adventures of the crown Prince, Marthandavarma on how he eliminates his arch rivals one by one, so as to ascend to the throne of Kingdom of Travancore.

Cast

A short list of artists who acted in the movie
 Jaidev
 Andi
 A. V. P. Menon
 V. Naik
 Padmini
 Devaki
 V. C. Kutty
 S. V. Nath
 Sundaram Iyer
 A. P. Padmanabha Menon
 Pattammal
 Pious
 Sunder Raj
 Kesava Menon
 Thilakam

The casting credits of the above artists variably contradict in the sources. The character Marthanda Varma is attributed to the actor Jaidev in IMDb, whereas in Weblokam (Malayalam Webdunia), the same character is attributed to actor Andi, who is referred to as a Tamil from Thalassery. The possibility of the name Jaidev being the screen alias of Andi conflicts with the information in Cini Diary, where both the names are listed separately under the artist credits of the movie.

Weblokam further states that Tamil actresses Pattamal and Devaki Bhai donned the roles of Subadra and Sulaikha respectively, of which the former's character credit brings up another contradiction as Cini Diary states Pattamal is Padmini or rather Pattamal's screen alias is Padmini, who is attributed to the character Parukutty in IMDb.

The producer R. Sunder Raj has done the role of Bheeram Khan, whereas A. V. P. Menon and V. Naik did the roles of Anantha Padmanaban and Padmanabhan Thampi, respectively.

Crew
A short list of crew behind the film
 Producer - R. Sunder Raj
 Screenplay, Direction – P. V. Rao
 Cinematography – Pandurang E. Naik

Production
The film was produced by R. Sunder Raj under the banner of Shri Rajeswari Films and production of the film was started in 1931, during which the producer ignored the queries regarding the copyright of the novel related to adapting it to the film.

The film had title cards in English and Malayalam, some of which were taken from the original text. A few of the title cards and actions make reference to the Swadeshi movement. The film also featured with a seven-minute actual newsreel footage of temple procession of the late Sri. Chithira Thirunal Maharaja of Travancore.

Release
The movie was released through Shri Rajeswari Films in 1933 at Capitol theatre, Thiruvananthapuram of Thiruvithaankoor. The movie ran into copyright problems during its release with the publishers of the novel in that period, Kamalalaya Book Depot and was withdrawn from screenings after its opening day, following a court order marking the first copyright case in the Indian film industry and literature publishing of Kerala. The print of film was under the custody of Kamalalaya Book Depot until 1974, when the National Film Archive of India negotiated and acquired the same.

Apparently, this film also contain the first lip kiss of Indian Cinema.

A print of film, which is the only silent film of south India fully available as of now is preserved at the National Film Archive of India (NFAI), Pune. The film was reportedly shown at the 1994 Film Festival of Kerala. In 2011, this film was screened at the "Filka" International film festival in Thiruvananthapuram.

See also
 Marthandavarma, a novel by C. V. Raman Pillai

References

External links
http://www.malayalachalachithram.com/movie.php?i=2

Indian black-and-white films
1930s Malayalam-language films
Indian silent films
Films based on Indian novels
Films based on historical novels